Ruth Hagengruber is a German philosopher, currently professor and head of philosophy at the University of Paderborn. She specialises in the history of women philosophers as well as philosophy of economics and computer science and is a specialist on Émilie Du Châtelet. Hagengruber is the director of the Center for the History of Women Philosophers and Scientists and founder of the research area EcoTechGender. She invented the Libori Summer School and is the creator of the Encyclopedia of Concise Concepts by Women Philosophers, for which she holds the position of editor in chief together with Mary Ellen Waithe.

Hagengruber’s research is dedicated to the revision of a patriarchal history, specially to the rediscovery of women’s alternative contributions to the history of philosophy and the history of economics, focusing on circle and universality based economics as an approach of inclusive economic ethics. She published on value theory in Feminist Economics and reflects on technical design from a feminist (and inclusive) point of view, such as autonomous driving, a different approach to labour, and a profound acknowledgment of creative skills.

Career
Hagengruber was born in Regen. She earned her PhD in philosophy from Ludwig Maximilian University of Munich and taught at the philosophy department at the University of Koblenz and Landau and the University of Cologne before coming to Paderborn University to be professor and head of philosophy. In April 2012, the first Master Erasmus Joint Programme dedicated to the Study of the History of Women Philosophers was established in cooperation between Paderborn University and Yeditepe University in Istanbul.

Hagengruber was vice president of the Deutsche Gesellschaft für Französischsprachige Philosophie (1997-2002) and the European Society for Early Modern Philosophy ESEMP (2004–2007). She was also a member of the Advisory Board of the Munich Center for Technology in Society (MCTS) at the Technische Universität München (2011-2019).  In 2019, Hagengruber became vice president of the Deutsche Akademikerinnenbund DAB and was elected member of the Leibniz Sozietät der Wissenschaften zu Berlin. Hagengruber is an honorary member of the International Association for Computing and Philosophy (IACAP) and a board member of the International Association of Women Philosophers (IAPH) and organizer of the IAPH conference Defining the Future, Rethinking the Past. Furthermore, she directs the research and work group Frauen in der Geschichte der Philosophie (Women in History of Philosophy) of the Deutsche Gesellschaft für Philosophie.

In 2015, Ruth Hagengruber was awarded the Wiener Schmidt Prize of the Society for Cybernetics and Systems Theory. With her team, she received the award for Teaching Philosophy in the Media (2014) and Online Teaching Philosophy goes MOOC (2016). In 2018, the project The Encyclopedia of Concise Concepts by Women Philosophers (ECC) by the Center for the History of Women Philosophers and Scientists directed by Hagengruber received the DARIAH-DE DH-Award 2018, “Tools and Projects” for exceptional work in digital humanities.

Hagengruber has edited various books on the history of women philosophers. In 2015, she edited the special issue of The Monist on the "History of Women's Ideas" together with Karen Green. She created the German book series Frauen in Philosophie und Wissenschaft and the international book series Women in the History of Philosophy and Sciences with Mary Ellen Waithe and Gianni Paganini. In 2019, she edited a special issue of the British Journal for the History of Philosophy on "Women Philosophers in Early Modern Philosophy" with Sarah Hutton.

Teaching and research areas

History of Women Philosophers and Scientists 

The Teaching and Research Area "History of Women Philosophers" headed by Hagengruber aims at renewing the long-lasting tradition of women philosophers. Ruth Hagengruber started her lecture "2600 Years History of Women Philosophers" in 2011. In 2016, she founded the research project Center for the History of Women Philosophers and Scientists. In this capacity, she awards the Elisabeth of Bohemia Prize for the recognition of women in the history of philosophy since 2018  and published the first digital and historical-critical edition of Émilie du Châtelets St Petersburg Manuscripts.

EcoTechGender 
In 2006, Hagengruber founded the Teaching and Research Area: EcoTechGender on the social and ethical implications of artificial intelligence. She defines economics, technology and gender as the challenging and decisive factors of the future. "EcoTechGender" at the University of Paderborn is dedicated to the philosophical analysis of the relation between these topics.

Philosophy in the Media 

With the project “Philosophy in the Media“ the philosophy department in Paderborn breaks new grounds. It was launched by Hagengruber (philosophy), Gerhard E. Ortner (dramatic staging), Ulrich Lettermann (music), and Bernhard Koch (filming) to present women philosophers’ thoughts via student performances to the wider public. These performances feature women philosophers and scientists including Emilie du Châtelet (1706-1749), Ada Lovelace and Elizabeth of Bohemia (1618-1680). The past event “Philosophy On Stage” focused on Elizabeth of Bohemia’s influence on René Descartes. In December 2014, the project won the Advancement Award for Innovation and Quality in Teaching 2014 of the University of Paderborn.

Publications 

 Hagengruber, Ruth und Hutton, Sarah. 2019. eds., Women Philosophers in Early Modern Philosophy. British Journal for the History of Philosophy 27. Routledge. (Online)
 Hagengruber, Ruth und Hecht, Hartmut. 2018. Emilie Du Châtelet und die deutsche Aufklärung. (Online)
 Luft, Sebastian und Hagengruber, Ruth. 2018. Women Phenonomologists on Social Ontology, Basel: Springer Nature. (Online)
 Hagengruber, Ruth und Green, Karen. 2015. The History of Women's Ideas. The Monist 98. Oxford: Oxford University Press.
 Hagengruber, Ruth, Riss, Uwe. (Eds.). 2014. Philosophy, Computing and Information Science. London: Pickering & Chatto.
 Hagengruber, Ruth / Ess, Charles. (Hg.). 2011. The Computational Turn: Past, Presents, Futures? Münster: MV-Wissenschaft.
 Hagengruber, Ruth (Hg.). 2011. Emilie du Châtelet between Leibniz and Newton. New York u.a.: Springer. (Online)
 Hagengruber, Ruth / Rodrigues, Ana. (Hg.). 2010. Von Diana zu Minerva. Philosophierende Aristokratinnen des 17. und 18. Jahrhunderts. Berlin: Akademie-Verlag. (Online)
 Hagengruber, Ruth (Hg.). 2002. Philosophie und Wissenschaft – Philosophy and Science. Tagungsakten zum 70. Geburtstag von Wolfgang H. Müller. Würzburg: Königshausen & Neumann. (Online)
 Hagengruber, Ruth. 2000. Nutzen und Allgemeinheit. Zu einigen grundlegenden Prinzipien der Praktischen Philosophie. Sankt Augustin: Academia Verlag. (Habilitationsschrift)
 Hagengruber, Ruth (Hg.). 21999 [11998]. Klassische philosophische Texte von Frauen. Texte vom 14. bis zum 20. Jahrhundert. München: dtv.
 Hagengruber, Ruth / Stein, Otti / Wedig, Sigrid (Hgg.). 1996. Begegnungen mit Philosophinnen. Koblenz: Quast Verlag.
 Hagengruber, Ruth. 1994. Tommaso Campanella. Eine Philosophie der Ähnlichkeit. Sankt Augustin: Academia Verlag. (Dissertation)
 Hagengruber, Ruth (Hg.). 1980. Inseln im Ich. München: Matthes & Seitz.

External links 
 Homepage University of Paderborn, CV
 Research Area EcoTechGender
 Research Area History of Women Philosophers
 Who-is-Who at the University Paderborn, Page 30
 Professors at the University of Paderborn, Portrait
 Publications
 Publikationen: History of Women Philosophers and Scientists
 Lecture Liberlaism Gummersbach 2012

References 

Living people
German women philosophers
20th-century German philosophers
Academic staff of Paderborn University
Ludwig Maximilian University of Munich alumni
1958 births
Academic staff of the University of Koblenz and Landau
21st-century German philosophers
People from Regen (district)